Bruce E. Wampold (born November 25, 1948) is Emeritus Professor of Counseling Psychology at the University of Wisconsin—Madison. and Director of the Research Institute at Modum Bad Psychiatric Center, Vikersund, Norway.

Education
Wampold received his B.A. in mathematics from the University of Washington, his M.Ed. in educational psychology from the University of Hawaii, and his Ph.D. in counseling psychology from the University of California, Santa Barbara.  He is a licensed psychologist and Board Certified by the American Board of Professional Psychology and has an Honorary Doctorate from Stockholm University.

Work in psychotherapy
Wampold is known for developing the contextual model of psychotherapy, which constitutes an alternative to the prevailing theory of the effectiveness of psychotherapy, known as the medical model.

Awards and honors
 Fellow of the American Psychological Association, 
 Award for Distinguished Professional Contributions to Applied Research from the American Psychological Association
 Distinguished Research Career Award, Society for Psychotherapy Research.
 Wisconsin Alumni Research Foundation Named Professor

References

External links

Living people
1948 births
University of Wisconsin–Madison faculty
21st-century American psychologists
People from Olympia, Washington
American psychotherapists
University of Washington College of Arts and Sciences alumni
University of Hawaiʻi alumni
University of California, Santa Barbara alumni
Fellows of the American Psychological Association
20th-century American psychologists